Madhu Divisional Secretariat is a Divisional Secretariat  of Mannar District, of Northern Province, Sri Lanka.

References
 Divisional Secretariats Portal
 Population of Madhu
 Ministry of Home Affairs

Divisional Secretariats of Mannar District